The Tiburon Peninsula is a landform of the San Francisco Bay Area's Marin County and is home to the incorporated municipalities of Tiburon, Belvedere, and a portion of Corte Madera, California. Much of the peninsula is unincorporated, including portions of the north side and the communities of Paradise Cay and Strawberry. Richardson Bay separates the peninsula from the Marin County mainland. Angel Island lies app. 1 mile south of the peninsula's southern tip. Much of the land area of the Tiburon Peninsula was part of a Spanish land grant originally given to the early Californian John Reed. A prominent feature of the Tiburon Peninsula is Ring Mountain, Marin County, which forms the backbone of the peninsula and is the highest elevation of the peninsula. The Tiburon Peninsula is the location of a number of rare and endangered flora species, and is also the site of ancient Native American rock carvings. The mineral lawsonite was first described from an occurrence on the Tiburon Peninsula.

History

Development

Politics

Education

Schools

Public libraries

See also

 Old Saint Hilary Church
 Triangle Marsh

References

Landforms of Marin County, California
Landforms of the San Francisco Bay Area
Peninsulas of California
Tiburon, California